Cassiano may refer to:

Given name:
Cassiano Conzatti (1862–1951), Italian-born botanist, explorer and pteridologist, director of the Oaxaca Botanical Garden in Mexico
Cassiano Leal (born 1971), former international freestyle swimmer from Brazil
Cassiano Dias Moreira (born 1989), Brazilian forward
Cassiano dal Pozzo (1588–1657), Italian scholar and patron of arts
Cassiano Ricardo (1895–1974), Brazilian journalist, literary critic, and poet
Cassiano Mendes da Rocha (born 1975), former Brazilian football player

Surname:
Dick Cassiano, halfback in the National Football League
Sérgio Cassiano (born 1967), Brazilian jazz composer, percussionist, writer, producer, and bandleader

Stage name:
Cassiano (1943–2021), Brazilian singer-songwriter and guitarist

Places:
18335 San Cassiano, minor planet discovered September 19, 1987
San Cassiano, town and commune in the Italian province of Lecce and region of Apulia in south-east Italy
San Cassiano, Venice, 14th-century Roman Catholic church in the San Polo sestiere of the Italian city of Venice
San Cassiano Formation, geologic formation on the Southern Alps (Northeast of Italy) in the Dolomites

See also
Assiano
CASINO
Casino
Cassano (disambiguation)
Cassian (disambiguation)
Cassino